Watership Down is an adult CGI-animated adventure fantasy drama film directed by Noam Murro. It is based on the 1972 novel of the same name by Richard Adams and adapted by Tom Bidwell. It was  released on 22 December 2018 in the United Kingdom and internationally on Netflix the next day. The BBC broadcast comprised two back-to-back episodes per day.

The music video for "Fire on Fire" (from Watership Down) by Sam Smith was released on 21 December 2018.

Voice cast

 James McAvoy as Hazel
 Nicholas Hoult as Fiver
 John Boyega as Bigwig
 Ben Kingsley as General Woundwort
 Tom Wilkinson as Threarah
 Gemma Arterton as Clover
 Peter Capaldi as Kehaar
 Olivia Colman as Strawberry
 Mackenzie Crook as Hawkbit
 Anne-Marie Duff as Hyzenthlay
 Taron Egerton as El-Ahrairah
 Freddie Fox as Captain Holly
 James Faulkner as Frith
 Lee Ingleby as Campion
 Miles Jupp as Blackberry
 Daniel Kaluuya as Bluebell
 Rory Kinnear as Cowslip
 Craig Parkinson as Sergeant Sainfoin
 Rosamund Pike as the Black Rabbit of Inlé
 Daniel Rigby as Dandelion
 Jason Watkins as Captain Orchis
 Adewale Akinnuoye-Agbaje as Vervain
 Gemma Chan as Dewdrop
 Rosie Day as Thethuthinnang 
 Henry Goodman as Blackavar
 Peter Guinness as Silverweed
 Charlotte Spencer as Nettle

Production
In July 2014, it was announced that BBC would be airing a new animated serial of Watership Down based on the 1972 novel and the 1978 film. In April 2016, it was announced that the series would be a co-production between BBC and Netflix, and would consist of four one hour episodes. The series has a budget of £20 million. The rest of the voice cast was announced in November 2018.

Release
Originally set for release on 25 December 2018, Watership Down was released on 22 December 2018, on BBC One in the UK and on 23 December 2018 on Netflix, internationally.

Episodes

Reception
Watership Down received generally positive reviews from critics, with praise for the narrative, performances of its voice cast and  soundtrack, but receiving some criticism for its somewhat tamer tone and the quality of the computer animation, described as "soulless" and "clunky". On Rotten Tomatoes, the drama has an approval rating of 77% based on reviews from 22 critics, with its critical consensus reading "Though its animation leaves something to be desired, Watership Down is a faithful adaptation that will resonate with viewers of any age." On Metacritic, it has a weighted average score of 76 out of 100 based on five critics, indicating "generally favourable reviews".

The Guardian and The Independent both gave it two stars out of five, calling the production "tame, drab and deeply unsatisfying." and "spectacularly ho-hum – less tooth and claw than head shake."

The Times was more positive, giving it three stars out of five, writing "this was a meaty, lovingly made production that, spread over two days, felt far too long," while The New York Times noted that though the adaptation "fails its potential, it benefits from strong voice performances and a solid central story. Even this easy-listening version, which lays on the romance, jokes and limp dialogue, has moments of grandeur and the sweep of a fantasy epic." Despite the negative reviews, it got four stars from the Daily Telegraph, they said that it had an "emotional bite".

The drama won a Daytime Emmy Award for Outstanding Special Class Animated Program. It also got nominated for a Daytime creative arts Emmy awards for outstanding directing, sound editing, sound mixing, graphic design and music direction.

References

External links
 
 
 

2018 British television series debuts
2018 British television series endings
2010s American adult animated television series
2010s American animated television miniseries
2010s British animated television series
2010s British television miniseries
American adult animated adventure television series
American adult animated drama television series
American adult animated fantasy television series
American adult computer-animated television series
British adult animated adventure television series
British adult animated drama television series
British adult animated fantasy television series
BBC television miniseries
English-language Netflix original programming
Television shows based on British novels
Animated television series about rabbits and hares